The 1937 International University Games were organised by the Confederation Internationale des Etudiants (CIE) and held in Paris, France. Held from 21–29 August, 22 nations competed in fourteen sports. Boxing, cycling, field hockey, handball, and shooting all made their first appearance at the games. The gymnastics competition was dropped, however, and did not appear again until 1961. This tournament marked the first appearance of a South American nation, in the form of Brazil.

Sports

Athltics medal summary

Men

Women

Athletics medal table

Participating nations

References
World Student Games (Pre-Universiade) - GBR Athletics 

Summer World University Games
Athletics at the Summer Universiade
International University Games
International University Games
International University Games
Athletics in Paris
International athletics competitions hosted by France